Roane County Schools may refer to:
Roane County Schools (Tennessee), a school district in Roane County, Tennessee
Roane County Schools (West Virginia), a school district in Roane County, West Virginia